Rumen Stoyanov (born 13 December 1976) is a Bulgarian football player, currently playing for Tundzha Yambol as a defender.

References

Living people
1976 births
Bulgarian footballers
Association football defenders
PFC Svetkavitsa players
First Professional Football League (Bulgaria) players